Clare Martorana is an American business executive and government official serving as the Federal Chief Information Officer of the United States. She previously served as the CIO of the United States Office of Personnel Management from 2019 to 2021.

Education 
Martorana earned a Bachelor of Arts degree in history from the College of Saint Elizabeth.

Career 
Martorana has worked as a business executive and film producer. Martorana produced Everything Relative, Sleepwalk, and Meet Prince Charming. She was also the first assistant director of five episodes of Blue's Clues. 

Martorana was the COO of Oncology.com before joining WebMD as a senior vice president. In 1999 and 2000, Martorana was the vice president and executive producer of CBS HealthWatch by Medscape. She later became the general manager and president of Everyday Health. In 2016, Martorana joined the United States Digital Service as a digital service expert. In 2019, she became the CIO of the United States Office of Personnel Management. On March 9, 2021, it was announced that Martorana would serve as the Federal Chief Information Officer of the United States in the Biden administration.

She was included in the 2022 Fast Company Queer 50 list.

References 

Living people

Saint Elizabeth University alumni
Biden administration personnel
Year of birth missing (living people)